The Xenon Codex is the fifteenth studio album by the English space rock group Hawkwind, released in 1988. It spent two weeks on the UK albums chart peaking at #79.

The group's line-up remained unchanged for three years. The album was recorded at Loco Studios, Caerleon and Rockfield Studios, Monmouth in February and March 1988. It was produced with Guy Bidmead, who had previously been Vic Maile's assistant.

The lyrics to "The War I Survived" and "Heads" were written by Roger Neville-Neil, who was a Hawkwind fan. "Lost Chronicles" is banded as separate track, but it forms the instrumental middle section of "Neon Skyline".

The cover is by Bob Walker, who had also illustrated the inner sleeve for The Chronicle of the Black Sword and adapted Michael Butterworth's Ledge of Darkness in graphic novel form. It is an Art Deco design derived from the hawk by Barney Bubbles on the rear cover of Astounding Sounds, Amazing Music. Initial copies came in a fold-out sleeve with a die-cut front.

The group undertook a 25 date UK tour in April to promote the album. The Hammersmith Odeon show on 21 April was recorded by BBC Radio 1 for broadcast as a 60-minute in-concert programme.

After the tour, drummer Thompson left the group. He was replaced by former Dumpy's Rusty Nuts drummer Mick Kirton for some September dates, but the group felt he was unsuitable. Richard Chadwick, a veteran drummer of groups involved with English free-festival scene, then joined for an 18 date UK tour in November and December. The Nottingham Rock City show on 7 December was recorded, and part released on Undisclosed Files Addendum (1995), with these tracks being included as bonus tracks on the 2010 re-issue.

Tracks

Side 1
"The War I Survived" (Dave Brock, Alan Davey, Roger Neville-Neil) – 5:23
"Wastelands of Sleep" (Kris Tait, Brock) – 4:14
"Neon Skyline" (Davey) – 2:19
"Lost Chronicles" (Harvey Bainbridge) – 5:20
"Tides" (Huw Lloyd-Langton) – 2:54

Side 2
"Heads" (Brock, Neville-Neil) – 4:55
"Mutation Zone" (Bainbridge, Brock) – 3:57
"E.M.C." (Bainbridge) – 4:53
"Sword of the East" (Davey) – 5:24
"Good Evening" (Hawkwind) – 4:35

Atomhenge CD bonus tracks
"Ejection" (Calvert) – 4:29
"Motorway City" (Brock) – 6:47
"Dragons and Fables" (Lloyd-Langton) – 3:19
"Heads" (Neville-Neil, Brock) – 3:52
"Angels of Death" (Brock) – 5:36

Personnel
Hawkwind
Dave Brock – electric guitar, keyboards, vocals
Harvey Bainbridge – keyboards, vocals
Huw Lloyd-Langton – electric guitar
Alan Davey – bass guitar, electric guitar, vocals
Danny Thompson Jr – drums

Credits
Recorded at Loco Studios, Caerleon and Rockfield Studios, Monmouth, February and March 1988. 
Produced with Guy Bidmead.
Cover by Bob Walker.

Release history
April 1988: Great Western Records, GWLP 26, vinyl and CD - initial vinyl copies came in a fold out cover.
1989: Enigma/GWR, 7 75407–1, USA CD and vinyl
February 1992: Castle Communications, CLACD 281, UK CD
July 1999: Essential Records, ESMCD 737, UK CD digipak
May 2010: Atomhenge (Cherry Red) Records, ATOMCD1022, UK CD

Reception

External links
Atomhenge Records

References

1988 albums
Hawkwind albums
Albums recorded at Rockfield Studios